The Commonwealth Railways CN class was a class of  steam locomotives purchased by the Commonwealth Railways, Australia, from the Canadian National Railway (CN) during World War II, for use on the Trans-Australian Railway.

The eight locomotives in the class had been built in 1907-1908 by Montreal Locomotive Works, Montreal, Quebec, for the Canadian Northern Railways, and, after passing into CN ownership in 1918, had been part of CN's H6c class.

References

Notes

Bibliography

External links

CN class
Railway locomotives introduced in 1942
MLW locomotives
4-6-0 locomotives
Standard gauge locomotives of Australia
Scrapped locomotives
Standard gauge locomotives of Canada